Vasant "Vas" Narasimhan is an Indian-American physician and the chief executive officer of Novartis (since 2018).

Early life and education 
Narasimhan was born in Pittsburgh in 1976 to parents who originated from Tamil Nadu, India. Narasimhan’s mother was a nuclear engineer for Public Service Electric and Gas Company and his father was an executive at Hoeganaes Corporation.

Narasimhan received his bachelor's degree in biological sciences from University of Chicago, his M.D. from Harvard Medical School and his master's degree in public policy from the John F. Kennedy School of Government.

During Narasimhan’s undergraduate and post-graduate studies, Narasimhan worked on public health programs including with the American Red Cross in The Gambia and child poverty in India.

Career 
Narasimhan has previously served as Global Head of Biopharmaceuticals & Oncology Injectables at Sandoz International.

Narasimhan joined McKinsey & Co, Inc. on leaving Harvard and was recruited by Novartis in 2005. From 2014 to 2016, he served as the Global Head of Development for Novartis Pharmaceuticals. From 2016 to 2018, he held the role of Global Head of Drug Development and Chief Medical Officer within the company. On September 5, 2017, he was named the successor of Joseph Jimenez as CEO of Novartis.

He is a member of the U.S. National Academy of Medicine and a member of the board of fellows of Harvard Medical School.  He also serves on the boards of African Parks, a nonprofit conservation organization, and of the Pharmaceutical Research and Manufacturers of America.

In 2015, Fortune listed Narasimhan 7th in their '40 under 40' list.

Personal life 
Narasimhan married Srishti Gupta in 2003, after meeting her at Harvard while organizing an Asian cultural festival.

References

External links 
 CNBC Interview: Vasant Narasimhan at the China Development Forum in Beijing, 2018

1976 births
American health care chief executives
Members of the National Academy of Medicine
University of Chicago alumni
Harvard Medical School alumni
Novartis people
Living people
Harvard Kennedy School alumni
American people of Indian Tamil descent
Chief executives in the pharmaceutical industry